Lithostege fuscata is a species of geometrid moth in the family Geometridae. It is found in North America.

The MONA or Hodges number for Lithostege fuscata is 7629.

References

Further reading

 
 

Chesiadini
Articles created by Qbugbot
Moths described in 1906